Uyirile Kalanthathu is a 2000 Indian Tamil-language romantic drama film directed by K. R. Jaya which stars Suriya, Jyothika and  Raghuvaran, with Sivakumar and Raadhika in supporting roles. The film opened in September 2000, to mixed  reviews from critics despite getting a superhit verdict. The film was dubbed into Hindi as Surya Bhai MBBS (2007), in Telugu as Poratam and in Malayalam as Raghu Raman IAS.

Plot
Suriya is a medical college student. Priya is his girlfriend, Sethu Vinayagam is his father, and Raghuram is his elder brother, who is the district collector. Suriya is the youngest son of the family, and this gives much heartburn to Raghuram. Their rivalry begins from childhood and can be illustrated by the scene where the elder brother pinches his baby brother just to see him cry. The jealousy grows into adulthood. Raghuram's aim in life is to see Suriya's life beset with problems, thanks to him. However, Suriya and his parents are unaware of the jealousy that has possessed Raghuram. When Raghuram discovers the love between Suriya and Priya, he passes on the word to Priya's elder brother, who is a known rowdy around the area. He does this thinking the rowdy would manage to beat up Suriya and perhaps separate both Suriya and Priya. This plan backfires, when the rowdy is more than happy to get them both married because he cares about his sister's happiness. Raghuram then pushes Suriya over a cliff edge. Later, in court, Suriya is revealed to be alive and unites with his family and Priya, and Raghuram is sent for treatment.

Cast

Suriya as Suriya
Jyothika as Priya
Raghuvaran as Raghuram
Sivakumar as Inspector Sethu Vinayagam, Suriya's father
Raadhika as Meenakshi
Mutham Sivakumar as Siva
Balaji as Kumar, Suriya's friend
Kanal Kannan as Kanal
Vaiyapuri as Siva's assistant
D. R. K. Kiran as College Student
Hari Prashanth as younger Raghuram
Aravind Akash as a dancer

Production
The shooting for the film progressed in Chennai, Bangalore and Mysore among other places. The film marked the debut of K.R. Jaya as director, while it was also the first production venture of Abayambika films. Mutham Sivakumar who was the manager to 'Sivashakti' Pandian produced his first independent venture with the film, while playing a crucial role in the film. Jyothika signed on to pair with Suriya again before the release of their maiden venture together, Poovellam Kettuppar (1999).

Soundtrack

The soundtrack of the film was composed by Deva. Lyrics written by Vairamuthu, Kalaikumar and K. Subash.

Release and reception
A reviewer from Sify described the venture as "strong and so far unexplored theme about sibling rivalry and superb acting" but claimed that "the unwarranted twist in the end has somewhat reduced the impact". The reviewer claims that the performances of Sivakumar and Radhika "score over everyone else", while Raghuvaran and Surya also "shine", but is critical of Jyothika saying she "should replenish fast her dwindling stock of expressions". A critic from TMCafe noted it was "an entertainer that manages to rise a little above the routine run-of-the-mill ones." The performance won further film offers for Surya.

Deva won the Tamil Nadu State Film Award for Best Music Director in 2000 for his work in the film along with his work in Kushi and Sanditha Velai. The film won the second runner-up prize in the award ceremony for Best Family Film, finishing behind Budget Padmanabhan and Mugavaree.

References

External links
 

2000 films
Indian romantic drama films
2000s Tamil-language films
Films scored by Deva (composer)
2000 romantic drama films
2000 directorial debut films